Jeison Guzmán (born October 8, 1998) is a Dominican  professional baseball shortstop in the Kansas City Royals organization. Guzmán currently holds the distinction of being a phantom ballplayer, having spent three days on the active roster for the Kansas City Royals but never appearing in a major league game.

Career

Kansas City Royals
Guzmán signed with the Kansas City Royals as an international free agent on July 3, 2015, for a $1.5 million signing bonus. he split the 2016 season between the DSL Royals and AZL Royals, hitting a combined .247/.314/.354/.668 with 1 home run and 19 RBI. He spent the 2017 season with the Burlington Royals, hitting .207/.286/.249/.535 with 0 home run and 15 RBI. He split the 2018 season between Burlington and the Lexington Legends, hitting a combined .254/.327/.356/.683 with 4 home runs and 29 RBI. He spent the 2019 season with Lexington, hitting .253/.296/.373/.669 with 7 home runs and 48 RBI.	

Guzmán was added to the Royals 40–man roster following the 2019 season. On August 11, 2020, Guzmán was promoted to the active roster, but was optioned down on August 14 without making a Major League appearance. Guzmán did not play in a game in 2020 due to the cancellation of the minor league season because of the COVID-19 pandemic. On December 2, Guzmán was nontendered by the Royals and became a free agent. On December 16, 2020, Guzmán re-signed with the Royals on a minor league contract. Guzmán split the 2021 season between the Double-A Northwest Arkansas Naturals and the High-A Quad Cities River Bandits, slashing .255/.312/.401 with 6 home runs and 37 RBI in 66 games between the two teams. He elected free agency following the season on November 7.

Arizona Diamondbacks
On November 24, 2021, Guzmán signed a minor league contract with the Arizona Diamondbacks. He was released on June 5, 2022.

Kansas City Royals (second stint)
On August 10, 2022, Guzman signed a minor league deal with the Kansas City Royals.

References

External links

1998 births
Living people
Minor league baseball players
Baseball players at the 2020 Summer Olympics
Medalists at the 2020 Summer Olympics
Olympic medalists in baseball
Olympic bronze medalists for the Dominican Republic
Dominican Summer League Royals players
Arizona League Royals players
Burlington Royals players
Lexington Legends players
Leones del Escogido players
Baseball shortstops
Olympic baseball players of the Dominican Republic
Amarillo Sod Poodles players